Doddington could refer to

Places in England
Doddington, Cambridgeshire
Doddington, Cheshire
Doddington, Kent
Doddington, Lincolnshire
Doddington, Northumberland
Dry Doddington, Lincolnshire
Great Doddington, Northamptonshire

Ships
Doddington (East Indiaman), wrecked in Algoa Bay, South Africa in 1755

See also
Dodington (disambiguation)